Andrew Gerber is Vice President for Capabilities Analysis and Assessment at Raytheon Technologies.

Prior to joining Raytheon, he was director of the Georgia Tech Research Institute (GTRI) and senior vice president of the Georgia Institute of Technology. GTRI is the applied research arm of Georgia Tech.

Prior to joining GTRI, Gerber was the associate head of the Air and Missile Defense Technology Division at MIT Lincoln Laboratory.

Education
Gerber received an AB in chemistry from Duke University in 1979. From 1981 to 1987, he earned an MS, MPhil, and PhD, all in applied physics, from Yale University.

Career
Gerber began working at MIT Lincoln Laboratory as a staff member in 1988, leaving in 1991 to lead space surveillance efforts and later lead the ALTAIR radar at the Reagan Test Site in the Marshall Islands. He returned to Lincoln Laboratory in 1996 as assistant leader of the Air Defense Techniques Group. In 1997, Gerber began working with the Navy's Program Executive Office for Theater Surface Combatants as an intergovernmental Personnel Act appointee, where he helped stand up a new organization and initiated the development of a next generation of radars for the Surface Navy. He returned to Lincoln Laboratory again in 2001, and in 2002 he was named head of the Sensor Systems Division.

He became the associate head of the Air and Missile Defense Technology Division in 2004, a position he held until he was selected to become the director of GTRI in 2015.

Gerber left GTRI in 2018 to become Vice President for Innovation and Strategic Pursuits at Raytheon Integrated Defense Systems, and became Vice President for Capabilities Analysis and Assessment at Raytheon Missiles and Defense in 2019.

References

Georgia Tech Research Institute people
Living people
Duke University Trinity College of Arts and Sciences alumni
Yale University alumni
MIT Lincoln Laboratory people
Year of birth missing (living people)